1926 Polish Football Championship was the 6th edition of the Polish Football Championship (Non-League) and 5th completed season ended with the selection of a winner. The championship was decided in final tournament played among nine teams (winners of the regional A-Class championship) participated in the league which was divided into 3 groups: a Northern, a Southern and a Western one. The winners of each groups, Polonia Warsaw, Pogoń Lwów and Warta Poznań, played a Final Group tournament. The champions were Pogoń Lwów, who won their 4th Polish title.

It was the last edition of the Polish championships during the Second Polish Republic played in a non-league formula, because in 1927–1939 the champion of the country was chosen in the league. The next Polish non-league championship was held after the end of World War II – in 1946.

Competition modus
The final tournaments started on 15 August 1926 and concluded on 28 November 1926 (spring-autumn system). In each of groups the season was played as a round-robin tournament. A total of 9 teams participated. Each team played a total of 4 matches, half at home and half away, two games against each other team. Teams received two points for a win and one point for a draw. The winners of each groups played a Final Group tournament for the title.

Final tournament tables

Northern Group

Southern Group

Western Group

Final Group

Top goalscorers

References

Bibliography

External links
 Poland – List of final tables at RSSSF 
 List of Polish football championships 
 List of Polish football championships 

Polish Football Championship, 1926
Polish Football Championship, 1926
Polish
Polish
Seasons in Polish football competitions